James Alexander Heaslip (11 October 1900 – 13 August 1988) was an Australian politician who represented the South Australian House of Assembly seat of Rocky River from 1949 to 1968 for the Liberal and Country League.

Heaslip was born in Carrieton and educated at the Appila State School and Prince Alfred College. He was a farmer and grazier, as well as a director of Grosvenor Hotel Ltd and a number of other companies. He was vice-president of the South Australian Wheat and Woolgrowers' Association, a member of the University of Adelaide council from 1959 to 1961 and a member of the Primary Producers Assistance Committee from 1968 to 1971.

He married Nellie Burston McMurray in 1930. They had one son and three daughters.

References

 

1900 births
1988 deaths
Members of the South Australian House of Assembly
Liberal and Country League politicians
20th-century Australian politicians